Harnaut station  is a railway station in India. It is a station in the city of Harnaut, and is situated on the Bakhtiyarpur–Tilaiya line route passing through Nalanda.
Its service recording traffic of more than 1.5k passengers, and more than 25 trains per day. The Harnaut station is connected to most of the major cities in India by the railway network.

History
Bakhtiyarpur Bihar Light Railway was a -wide narrow-gauge railway laid by Martin's Light Railways from Bakhtiarpur to Bihar Sharif in 1903 and extended to Rajgir in 1911.

The broad-gauge line was extended from Rajgir to Tilaiya and opened in 2010. This line will transport coal from the Kodarma–Hazaribagh coal belt for Barh Super Thermal Power Station via Harnaut station.

Structure

Facilities

The major facilities available are waiting rooms, retiring room, computerised reservation facility, a reservation counter, and vehicle parking. The vehicles are not allowed to enter the station premises. There are both vegetarian and non-vegetarian food options, a tea stall, a book stall, a post and telegraphic office and Government Railway police (G.R.P.) office. Automatic ticket vending machines has been installed soon to reduce the wait for train tickets on the station.

Platform

Station platform Layout

There are four platforms in the Harnaut railway station. The platforms are interconnected with foot overbridge. It has two foot overbridges, the 2nd overbridge is under construction. 4th platform under construction.

Trains
Harnaut railway station is a major station of the East Central Railways. Several local passenger trains also run from Harnaut to neighbouring destinations on frequent intervals.
The following table lists all the trains passing from Harnaut station:

Development

The Indian Railways had planned to set up a Railway Station Development Corporation (RSDC) that will work on improving the major railway stations as Harnaut railway station by building and developing restaurants, shopping areas and food plazas for commercial business and improving passenger amenities. Railway planned to make station as A grade category.
After determining the railway stations that need to be good-class station by constructing well. A phased revamping has begun.
Deputy chief traffic manager  announced that the pending work at the railway tracks and platforms, presently under construction, will be sped up.
To assist passengers, especially the elderly, two foot overbridges may be constructed.

Gallery

Nearest airports

The nearest airports to Harnaut station are:

Lok Nayak Jayaprakash Airport, Patna 
Gaya Airport

See also
 Harnaut city
 Carriage Repair Workshop, Harnaut
  Trains passing through Harnaut
 Railway stations in Nalanda district

References

External links
 harnaut railway station Map
 official website of the nalanda district

Railway stations in Nalanda district
Danapur railway division